The Little Ones is a 1965 British family comedy film directed by British director Jim O'Connolly starring Carl Gonzales and Kim Smith. Dudley Foster stars as
Superintendent Carter and Derek Newark plays the strict Detective Sgt. Wilson.

Child actor Kim Smith was hired to play the part of the abused child Ted making his screen debut.

Plot
Two poor boys from London, Ted, an abused child and Jackie, the son of a prostitute run away to Liverpool in an attempt to stowaway on a ship bound to Jamaica. Arriving in Liverpool tired and hungry, they steal a suitcase which they hope to pawn for money to provide food. The owner of the suitcase, a wealthy shipping businessman, alerts the police and the boys are subsequently caught, scolded and sent home. Recognizing their dire life at home, a friendly superintendent tells the boys that many ships leave here for Jamaica.

Cast
Carl Gonzales as  Jackie
Kim Smith as  Ted
Dudley Foster as  Supt. Carter
Derek Newark as Det. Wilson
Jean Marlow as  Ted's Mother
Peter Thomas as  Ted's Father
Derek Francis as  Paddy
Cyril Shaps as Child Welfare Officer
John Chandos as  Lord Brantley
Diane Aubrey as  Peggy

External links 

The Little Ones at the New York Times

1965 films
Columbia Pictures films
Films directed by Jim O'Connolly
British comedy films
1965 comedy films
1960s English-language films
1960s British films